The Chinese Tennis Association (CTA) (Chinese: 中国网球协会) is the national governing body of tennis in China. It is a cooperative member of the All-China Sports Federation. The CTA is an independent legal person and it is recognized by China's Olympic Committee. The CTA is the only legal organization that represents China in world tennis organizations, including the International Tennis Federation and Asian Tennis Federation.

History 
The CTA was founded in 1953. Its highest organ of power is the CTA National Congress, and the secretariat is in charge of the administration work. The mission is to develop Chinese male and female top tennis players within the next 15 years.

Committees 
There are nine special committees under the CTA. 

Coaches Commission
Referees/Judges Commission
Junior and Youth Development Commission
Scientific Research Commission
Press and Publicity Commission
Marketing, Management & Development Commission
Professionalization and Specialization Commission
Amateur Activities Commission
Disciplines & Arbitration Commission

Headquarters 
The headquarters of CTA is in the Chinese capital Beijing.

See also 
Tennis in China
Sports in China

References 
 https://web.archive.org/web/20070805025953/http://www.chinaculture.org/gb/en_chinaway/2003-09/24/content_31939.htm
 http://en.olympic.cn/sports/summer_sports/2003-11-14/9478.html

External links 
OFFICIAL WEBSITE

China
Tennis in China
Tennis
1953 establishments in China
Sports organizations established in 1953